Shahzada Mumtaz Shikoh, 
(16 August 1643 – 6 December 1647) also known as Mumtaz Shukoh, was the third son of Mughal prince Dara Shikoh.

Ancestry

References

1643 births
1647 deaths
Mughal princes
People from Agra
Timurid dynasty